The 1980 South American Jaguars rugby union tour of South Africa was a series of seven matches played by the South American Jaguars rugby union team in South Africa in April and May 1980. The South American team won five of the matches but lost both that were against the South Africa national rugby union team.

The touring party was composed almost entirely of players from the Argentina national rugby union team and included all but one of the players who had played for Argentina in a drawn series with Australia in 1979. The touring party numbered twenty-six players, of whom one came from Brazil, one from Chile, one from Uruguay and one from Paraguay. The other twenty-two players came from Argentina, including the captain, Hugo Porta. Porta was asked to return to South Africa later that year to play for the South African Barbarians against the touring 1980 British Lions.

The players were individually invited to play in this tour and against South Africa in two matches played later during the Springboks tour of South America.

The "South America Jaguars" was a "ghost" Argentine national team, not officially recognised by Union Argentina de Rugby, to elude the Argentine government prohibition that since the early 1970s had forbid any official relationship between any Argentine sport federation and South African and Rhodesian ones due to the apartheid politics of the two African countries. This started in 1971 when the Argentine government forbid the national team from playing a match in Rhodesia during the tour in South Africa. Later in 1973, after a controversial period, the government forbid any sport relationship with South Africa.

Touring party
Manager: M. Dolan
Assistant Managers: L. Gradin, A. Otano
Captain: Hugo Porta

Backs
(Argentina unless stated)

Daniel Baetti
Ricardo Muniz
Marcelo Campo
Roberto Canessa (Uruguay)
Adolfo Cappelletti
Marcelo Loffreda
Rafael Madero
P. Mirando-Cardosa (Brazil)
F. Moscarda (Paraguay)
Hugo Porta
Juan Pablo Piccardo
R. Landajo
Alfredo Soares-Gache

Forwards
(Argentina unless stated)

Gabriel Travaglini
A. Voltan
Ernesto Ure
H. Silva
Enrique Rodríguez
Tomás Petersen
Javier Pérez-Cobo
Hugo Nicola
Fernando Morel
Alastair MacGregor Martin (Chile)
Alejandro Iachetti
Marcos Iachetti
Alejandro Cubelli

Matches

Bibliography

References

South America rugby union tour
South American Jaguars rugby union tours
Rugby union tours of South Africa
Rugby union and apartheid
rugby